Battle of Wallhof (also known as Battle of Walmozja) was a battle fought between Sweden and the Polish-Lithuanian Commonwealth on 7 January 1626.

History 
Swedish forces consisting of 3,100 men (2,100 of them cavalry) with six guns under Gustavus II Adolphus ambushed and took by surprise a Polish-Lithuanian force of 2,000–7,000 men (sources differ) with three guns under Jan Stanisław Sapieha. Polish-Lithuanian casualties amounted to between 1,000 and 2,300 dead, wounded or captured, and their commander collapsed from mental illness after this defeat.The Swedish king Gustav claimed: "not a single man is missing; everyone is where they should be" which is hard to believe, but to have suffered very small casualties is most likely true.

In the battle Gustavus Adolphus' reformed tactics, utilising close cooperation between infantry and cavalry, were tried for the first time. It was also the first time the Swedish cavalry successfully withstood the Polish cavalry.

The Swedes attacked the Lithuanian camp at dawn and, since the camp was located between two woods, the Lithuanian cavalry could not outflank the Swedes. Instead, the Swedes used the woods to fire upon the Lithuanian cavalry charge.

References

Sources
 http://runeberg.org/nfck/0270.html
 "Wallhof" in Nordisk familjebok (2nd edition, 1921)
 Sundberg, Ulf: , pp. 109–112, Hjalmarson & Högberg Bokförlag, Stockholm 2002, 
 Gullberg, Tom: , pp. 50–52, Schildts Förlags AB, Helsinki 2008, 

1626 in the Polish–Lithuanian Commonwealth
Wallhof 1626
Wallhof 1626
Wallhof 1626
Wallhof
17th century in Latvia
Gustavus Adolphus of Sweden
Valle, Battle of
Bauska Municipality
Semigallia